Mbege is a kind of banana beer traditional to the Chagga ethnic group of Tanzania located in Kilimanjaro region. It is an alcoholic drink made from fermented bananas. The process of making of mbege is labor-intensive and time-consuming as the majority of the process is done by hand without the aid of modern technology. The initial taste of mbege is said to be sweet and is followed by a slightly sour aftertaste.

Process
The bananas are mashed and then cooked in a cooking pot over a fire for 6 hours. It is then covered and left outside to ferment for up to 7 days. The fermented mixture is strained through shredded grass and banana leaves and a thick porridge made from the flour of finger millet and water is added to the strained liquid. A small amount of quinine-bark flour is then added to the mixture in order to tone down some of the sweetness of the bananas. It is then left to sit out for another day before it is ready to be consumed.

In popular culture
The process of making mbege was featured on Travel Channel's show Bizarre Foods with Andrew Zimmern.

References
 Bizarre Foods with Andrew Zimmern (Season 4, Episode 1: Tanzania)
 Kubo, R. and Kilasara, M. (2016): Brewing Technique of Mbege, a Banana Beer Produced in Northeastern Tanzania in: Beverages, 2, 21; doi:10.3390/beverages2030021 (http://www.mdpi.com/2306-5710/2/3/21)

African cuisine
Fermented drinks
Tanzanian culture
Types of beer